Lake Taharoa is located in the Northland Region of New Zealand near Ripiro Beach. There is also a lake of the same name in the Waikato region.

Lake Taharoa is a freshwater dune lake, part of the Kai Iwi lakes group. Lake Taharoa is one of the largest and deepest dune lakes in New Zealand, it also has some of the deepest recorded submerged vegetation (to a depth of 24 metres) of any North Island lake.

Lake Taharoa is a popular recreation area. It is used for boating, swimming, camping and there is a walking track around the perimeter of the lake.

Etymology
In Māori, taharoa means "long coast" (taha = coast, roa = long).

See also
List of lakes in New Zealand

References

External links
1:50,000 map
https://www.nrc.govt.nz/environment/water/lakes/
https://www.nrc.govt.nz/media/9537/kaiiwilakesmanagementplanwebsite.pdf
Water Quality and Ecological Indicators LAWA
https://natlib.govt.nz/records/22587705

Taharoa
Kaipara District